Purity FM is a radio station broadcasting on 102.5 MHz FM in southeastern Nigeria, located at Mgbakwu, a village in Awka North Local Government Area, Awka, Anambra State. It is a local station owned by the Federal Radio Corporation of Nigeria.

Purity FM started full operation on 1 July 2005. It was previously known as Gateway FM. A variety of music and talk programmes are broadcast in English and Igbo.

References 

Radio stations in Nigeria
Radio stations established in 2005
2005 establishments in Nigeria